Club Esportiu Felanitx is a Spanish football team based in Felanitx, in the autonomous community of Balearic Islands. Founded in 1943, it plays in Tercera División – Group 11, holding home matches at Estadio Es Torrentó-Mariona Caldentey.

Season to season

20 seasons in Tercera División

References

External links
 
ArefePedia team profile 
La Preferente team profile 
Soccerway team profile

Football clubs in the Balearic Islands
Sport in Mallorca
Association football clubs established in 1970
1970 establishments in Spain
Felanitx